Arthur Gordon Butchers  (11 February 1885 – 21 April 1960) was a New Zealand principal, educationalist and historian. He was born in Brunswick, Victoria, Australia on 11 February 1885.

In the 1947 New Year Honours, Butchers was appointed an Officer of the Order of the British Empire in recognition of his service as headmaster of The Correspondence School.

References

1885 births
1960 deaths
Te Aho o Te Kura Pounamu faculty
20th-century New Zealand historians
Writers from Melbourne
Australian emigrants to New Zealand
New Zealand Officers of the Order of the British Empire
Heads of schools in New Zealand
People from Brunswick, Victoria